The Carbondale Formation is a geologic formation in Indiana. It preserves fossils dating back to the Carboniferous period.

See also

 List of fossiliferous stratigraphic units in Indiana

References
 

Carboniferous Indiana
Carboniferous Illinois
Carboniferous southern paleotropical deposits